Minor Creek is a stream in the U.S. state of California.

Minor Creek is named after Isaac Minor.

See also
List of rivers of California

References

Rivers of Humboldt County, California
Rivers of Northern California